Brigitte Bako (born May 15, 1967) is a Canadian actress known for her role on Red Shoe Diaries. She also wrote, produced and starred in the adult comedy G-Spot.

Life and career
Bako was raised in Montreal, Quebec, Canada to Jewish parents. Her mother is a Holocaust survivor.

She trained with the Les Grands Ballets Canadiens and acted with the Canadian National Shakespeare Company.

She has starred in Hollywood productions, numerous Canadian-made movies, and films made in Canada by American producers. Bako's first major break was in Martin Scorsese's New York Stories. She co-starred with David Duchovny and Billy Wirth in Red Shoe Diaries; Benjamin Bratt and Michael Keaton in One Good Cop; and Ralph Fiennes in Strange Days. Saint Monica was featured at the 2002 Toronto International Film Festival, and Bako received a Genie Award nomination for Best Supporting Actress. Bako also received a Genie Award nomination for Best Actress in 1993. She starred in I Love a Man in Uniform, her first collaboration with Canadian producer Robert Lantos.

In addition to having the starring role, Bako makes her writing and executive producing debut in G-Spot.

Bako worked with David Duchovny again in a 2007 episode of the Showtime series Californication (Episode 9, "Filthy Lucre," as a Porsche saleswoman).

She voiced Angela in Gargoyles and Monique Dupre in Godzilla: The Series.

Filmography

Cinema 
New York Stories (1989)
One Good Cop (1991)
I Love a Man in Uniform (1993)
Dark Tide (1994)
Replikator (1994)
Strange Days (1995)
Irving (1995)
Double Take (1997)
Dinner and Driving (1997)
The Escape (1997)
The Week That Girl Died (1998)
Paranoia (1998)
Primary Suspect (2000)
Wrong Number (2001)
Sweet Revenge (2001)
Saint Monica (2002)
Who's the Top? (2005)

TV series 
Red Shoe Diaries (TV-1992)
Fifteenth Phase of the Moon (TV-1992)
Gargoyles ("Angela" [voice] 1995 - 1997)
3x3 Eyes (voice, 1995)
Godzilla: The Series (voice, 1998)
Secret Agent Man ("Mirage"; 2000, episode "Fail-Safe")
The Mind of the Married Man (2001)
The Atwood Stories (2003, episode "Isis in Darkness")
Law & Order (2004, episode "Darwinian")
G-Spot (2005–2009)
Californication (2007, episode "Filthy Lucre")

References

External links

1967 births
Anglophone Quebec people
Canadian expatriate actresses in the United States
Canadian film actresses
Jewish Canadian actresses
Canadian people of Hungarian-Jewish descent
Canadian television actresses
Canadian voice actresses
Living people
Actresses from Montreal